Avesthagen Limited is an integrated systems biology platform company headquartered in Bangalore, India. It was founded as an academic startup in 1998 by Villoo Morawala-Patell, a Rockefeller Fellow and grantee within NCBS-UAS, Bangalore. Avesthagen started business operations on March 21, 2001 with Series-A round investment led by ICICI Ventures and Tata Industries. Dr.Villoo Morawala Patell, is the Chairperson and Managing Director of Avesthagen Limited.

The company developed a unique portfolio of high-potential pharmaceutical, nutrition and agro-industrial bio-based products and continues to create novel products through convergence of food, pharma and population genetics leading to "Predictive, Preventive, Personalized" Healthcare and Food security". The goal of PPP healthcare is to use the advanced tools of molecular genetics to predict how patients will respond to drugs, reducing harm and increasing benefit. The dual combination of diagnostic and treatment technologies is at the heart of personalized medicine and will continue to transform modern healthcare dramatically.

Avestagenome Project 

The Avestagenome Project, founded by Dr.Villoo Morawala Patell was created to identify genetic risk factors within the Parsi population that predispose individuals to cancers and high morbidity diseases. Its database of genomic variants derived from the Parsi control population is used with other populations to identify early intervention and improve disease prevention strategies to deliver improved health outcomes. The endogamous Parsi community is characterized by greater longevity, fewer cases of lung, head, neck and esophageal cancers. At the same time, there is increased prevalence of Parkinson's & Alzheimer's diseases, cardiovascular disease, breast and prostate cancer, and male and female infertility. A pilot study by Avesthagen Limited into the prevalence of breast cancer biomarkers and metabolite signatures indicated unique signatures that are currently undergoing further validation in larger cohorts

The Parsi people, followers of Zoroastrianism, strongly advocate a responsible attitude towards the environment and respect to the elements of creation – fire, water, air, earth, and ether/space - with a special emphasis on fire, the purest of elements and an essential for all rituals and prayers. Veneration for fire has kept the vast majority of Parsis from smoking for centuries. Family pressure coupled with religious restrictions ensured a nearly smoke-free community. This makes the Parsi people and Avesthagen's Biobank the ideal control population to act as the reference standard for research into tobacco-related cancers and diseases

Since 2008, the Avestagenome Project has collected blood samples and extensive patient data from over 4,500 members of the Zoroastrian-Parsi community with a target of 15,000 Parsis globally by 2021. The molecular basis of longevity and age-related disorders, prioritising cancers, cardiovascular disease, diabetes and neurological disorders will be investigated in this cohort specifically. The project will provide insights into disease prediction and accelerate identification and development of biomarkers, predictive diagnostic tests, new drugs and therapies. In 2019, this initiative received support by the Foundation for a Smoke-Free World of Philip Morris International. The Foundation for a Smoke-Free World has awarded Villoo Morawala-Patell a grant of 2.29M USD to explore “Cancer risk in smoking subjects assessed by next generation sequencing profile of circulating free DNA and RNA.” The work carried out at Avesthagen Limited will combine liquid biopsy, next-generation sequencing, bioinformatics, artificial intelligence and machine learning to identify predictive and early-stage biomarkers of cancers in smokers. The project will use non-Parsi smoker and non-smoker samples from the wider Indian and other populations to gain insights into the evidence behind such data.

Recent publications 

AGENOME-ZPMS-HV2a-1: The first complete Zoroastrian Parsi Mitochondrial Reference Genome

In a new paper, available on bioRxiv in 2020, Avesthagen researchers characterized the genetic traits specific to the Zoroastrian-Parsi population—a community that has historically abstained from smoking. Because of this unique social practice, Zoroastrian-Parsi genes may help scientists characterize biomarkers predictive of diseases caused by tobacco use, such as lung, head and neck, and esophagus cancers.

To obtain a complete picture of population-specific variants, the Avesthagen team analyzed one hundred Zoroastrian-Parsi mitochondrial genomes to generate a “consensus genome.” This is a process that combines genetic information from a large number of individuals to determine the genetic traits typical to that population. The mitochondrial DNA of one hundred Zoroastrian-Parsi individuals sequenced created the “consensus mitochondrial genome” (AGENOME-ZPMCG V 1.0). For practical reasons, maternally-inherited mitochondrial DNA is often used for this type of analysis. The researchers also did phylogenetic mapping to determine the ancestry of the Zoroastrian-Parsi community and found a largely Persian origin, attesting to their historical migration from ancient Persia.

The researchers identified a total of 420 mitochondrial variants in the hundred Zoroastrian-Parsi genomes. Analysis of the variants revealed genetic indicators of longevity and of diseases that tend to emerge later in life. The genomes showed, for example, variants linked to colon and prostate cancer, as well as neurodegenerative conditions like Parkinson's disease. Because these diseases typically affect older individuals, indicators of their presence corroborate apparent longevity in the Zoroastrian-Parsi community.

The researchers found no indicators of tobacco-related diseases that often cause premature death. The genomes had a low frequency of mutations linked to carcinogen-induced diseases, such as lung cancer.

Dynamic Methylome Modification associated with mutational signatures in ageing and etiology of disease

More recently, in 2020, Avesthagen released a pre-print of their recent work on the whole genome methylation and variant analysis in one Zoroastrian-Parsi non-smoking individual, collected at an interval of 12 years apart on biorXiv titled "Dynamic Methylome Modification associated with mutational signatures in ageing and etiology of disease". The work identified 5258 disease relevant genes differentially methylated across this individual over 12 years and 24,948 genes corresponding to 4,58,148 variants specific to ZPMetG-Hv2a-1B, indicative of variants that accrued over time providing an understanding of the ageing methylome over time through the interplay between differentially methylated genes and variants in the etiology of disease.

Avgen Pharma 

Avgen Pharma, Avesthagen's biopharmaceuticals business develops a comprehensive range of biosimilars and antibody therapeutics for a spectrum of diseases including oncology, auto-immune, cardiovascular–targeted biologics. Avgen Pharma owns 8 biosimilar molecules with patents, processes, manufacturing rights for global licensing and sales & marketing rights. The biosimilars listed below have completed preclinical trials and are ready to enter clinical trials for validation.

 Avdesp: Biosimilar version of Darbepoetinalfa for treatment of chronic kidney disease and chemotherapy-induced anaemia
 Avent: Biosimilar version of etanercept, which targets autoimmune disorders such as rheumatoid arthritis, ankylosing spondylitis and psoriasis. RCGM, after reviewing analytical characterization data on Avent, granted permission in January 2009 to conduct pre-clinical toxicity and efficacy studies. Avgen Biopharma has successfully completed both toxicity and efficacy studies for Avent. Pre-clinical Efficacy of Avent was carried out in a USFDA accredited human TNF transgenic murine model of Rheumatoid Arthritis and the biosimilar has demonstrated high structural and pre-clinical similarity with etanercept
 Avcade is Avesthagen biosimilar version of Infliximab targeting Crohn's Disease and rheumatoid arthritis. Avgen Biopharma has developed stable cell lines to produce Infliximab. 
 Avplase is Avesthagen biosimilar version of Tenectaplase (also known as tPA) which targets acute myocardial infarction.  Avgen Biopharma has developed stable cell lines for the production of Tenectplase.

Avesta Nordic Research Private Limited 

Avesthagen's subsidiary, Avesta Nordic Research Private Limited engages primarily in the research, development, manufacturing and commercialization of our Food for Medicine portfolio of novel bioactives, functional food products and dietary supplements targeting the growing population of health conscious consumers around the globe. Avesthagen's research programs have led to a portfolio of scientifically validated botanical bioactive ingredients exclusively derived from traditional Indian medicine. Avesta Nordic's Functional ingredients, such as Teestar®, Cincata®, Bonapure™ & Bonaphyte™ have scientifically and some of them clinically validated health benefits to promote wellness through prevention of specific degenerative conditions: diabetes, obesity, metabolic syndromes, cardiovascular disorders and bone loss.

Avesthagen's DHA from algal sources will also provide the much need omega-3 fatty acids to vegetarians. The company is in the process of developing a manufacturing alliance for AvestaDHA and has developed a marketing alliances for its bioactives and DHA with a large beverage player in India, a large MNC retailer and a large Indian conglomerate.

The key products and product candidates are based upon, or include as a primary ingredient, scientifically and clinically validated plant extracts, or bioactives, sourced from traditional Indian medicine which we have researched and developed using ADePt, Avesta Nordic's proprietary bioactive discovery engine and information management platform and MetaGrid, the proprietary bioactive testing methodology. In May 2008, we launched Teestar, our first ADePt and MetaGrid derived bioactive, which we clinically demonstrated to reduce blood glucose levels.

AVA Seeds 

Avesthagen's subsidiary, AVA Seeds is engaged in the development of novel seed research, application of molecular markers and transgene based technologies to develop more productive food, feed, fuel and fiber based products to meet the growing needs of farmers, processors and consumers globally.

AVA Seeds® has developed cutting edge GMO technologies such as enhanced nutritional value, and sustainable green technology viz., biofuels and Environmentally Adapted Crop Technology for traits such as drought stress, salinity stress, nitrogen use efficiency.

The R&D focus and intellectual property has been developed around genes and promoters that enable the synthetic production of proteins and the generation of a specific GMO plant. In this respect, the company has developed a process patent on first, transformation of pearl millet and secondly, a modified tobacco plant reducing nicotine by c.80%.

The focus of AVA Seeds is in the following areas:

Nutrition-FIT

AVA Seeds project for the production of gene-modified seeds with enhanced nutritional value is the development of high-lycopene tomatoes. The company has produced a tomato variant through the introduction of a gene from rice, which on a greenhouse trial scale, has shown significantly increased levels of lycopene.

Hybrid-FIT

The development of male sterile hybrid variants of plants is an essential step in the development of enhanced seeds and transgenic variants. By creating male sterile variants with the desired traits, the developer of such variants can ensure that all of the produced seeds contain the desired trait and that the desired trait will not be diluted or lost due to naturally occurring crossbreeding.

AVA Seeds has developed a unique male sterility system for rice focused on the role of the mitochondria in the reproductive cycle of rice. By inserting a gene that inhibits certain respiratory functions of the mitochondria, we have created transgenic rice plants which are male sterile.

Tomatoes. Presently, a male sterile system does not exist in nature for the cultivated tomato, Lycoperison esculentum.  AVA Seeds has a strategy to develop male sterile hybrid line of tomatoes based on the same core technology applied for the development of male sterile rice. The process currently awaits evaluation in greenhouse trials.

AVA Seeds under the Oil world Program is developing transgenic Jathropha plants that have an increased oil yield for the production of biodiesel and also pearl millet, a grain whose fiber contains an enzyme that would facilitate cellulosic ethanol production without the use of external enzymes, thereby making the process faster and more cost effective than the sugarcane model, resulting in more sustainable cellulosic ethanol.

The company as part of its sustainability initiative developed BioPercept, a biocompostable plastic made from renewable resources that breaks down and decomposes, under industrial composting conditions, within 120 days.

DHA Program

Docosahexaenoic acid, or DHA and acid alpha linolenic acid, or ALA are two of the omega 3 acids, and which have shown a variety of positive health effects. This program is aimed at introducing key step genes for oil quality into mustard and sunflower with the goal of developing variants of the plants that produce these omega 3 acids.  Avesthagen Limited has isolated the gene sequence of the marine organism schizochytrium that is required for the production of the omega 3 fatty acids ALA, and DHA and is currently working on transforming mustard, by inserting the relevant isolated genes, to develop a variant that produces DHA, and on transforming Sunflower to develop variants that produce ALA and DHA.

Jatropha

Jatropha is a popular oilseed crop with potential for use in the production of biofuels. The oil content of Jatropha seeds ranges from around 30–35% and is inedible. This oil has traditionally been used as a fuel in domestic lighting and as a raw material for soap making. As a triglyceride, this oil is a poor fuel substitute due to its high viscosity, low flow rate, low volatility and poor cold flow rates. Derivatives of this oil, however, commonly referred to as “biodiesel” may be blended with diesel in varying proportions or used directly as a diesel substitute in compression-ignition engines.

Avesthagen Limited aims to develop high oil-yielding Jatropha curcas plants by transgenic manipulation of oil biosynthesis with oil-enhancing genes in addition to expanding its pipeline to other seeds, including sunflower, mustard and tobacco and intend to commence work on maize and cotton.

Transgenic plants that produce docosahexaenoic acid, commonly known as DHA, which is an omega-3 fatty acid. We have isolated the genes that produce DHA and ALA in schizochytrium, a marine organism, and have commenced the transformation of such genes into mustard. We are also developing yeast variety to produce DHA directly in a high-throughput manner in controlled environment.

Jatropha variants with increased oil yields for the production of biofuels. Jatropha seeds can be grown on marginal land and are a candidate for the production of biofuels. They have a naturally occurring oil content ranging from around 30–35% and their oil is inedible.

Criticisms 

In 2012, the company ran out of money and saw a number of exits by senior executives. Also in 2012, several former staff filed criminal and civil charges against the company.

References

External links
 Avesthagen Official website
 "Avesthagen to focus on health agri verticals"
 "Avesthagen plans to raise between Rs 500-600 crore"
 "Avesthagen signs MOU with CosmosID™ for Improving Diagnosis and Management of Tuberculosis"
 Avesthagen to acquire two seed companies, The Hindu, 10 Sep 2006
 Avesthagen ties up with French seeds major, The Hindu Business Line, 21 July 2006
 Avesthagen to invest Rs 45 crore more, The Hindu Business Line, 25 October 2005
 Presentation by CEO, October 2003, at US-Asia Technology Management Center, Stanford University
 Avestha Gengraine gets US patents for multiple use tech, The Economic Times, 10 Sep 2003
 Avesthagen granted US patent, Business Standard  Wednesday, 22 Jun 2011

Biotechnology companies of India
Companies based in Bangalore
Biotechnology companies established in 1998
1998 establishments in Karnataka